Masatsugu Nagato (born 18 November 1948) is a Japanese businessman, the president and CEO of Japan Post Holdings since April 2016, when he succeeded Taizo Nishimuro, following his hospitalization, having previously been president and CEO of Japan Post Bank.

References

1948 births
Living people
Japanese chief executives
20th-century Japanese businesspeople
21st-century Japanese businesspeople
Hitotsubashi University alumni
The Fletcher School at Tufts University alumni